Peter Bartlett may refer to:

 Peter Bartlett (actor) (born 1942), American-born actor
 Peter Bartlett (architect) (1929–2019), New Zealand architect and professor of architectural design
 Peter Bartlett (bishop) (born 1954), Bishop of Paraguay

See also